Gene Serdena is a set decorator. Serdena, along with production designer K. K. Barrett, was nominated for an Academy Award for Best Production Design for the 2013 film Her. He was nominated again for Best Production Design, alongside production designer Guy Hendrix Dyas, for their work in 2016 film ''Passengers at the 89th Academy Awards.

References

External links
 Reference in a book

Living people
American set decorators
Year of birth missing (living people)
Place of birth missing (living people)
Emmy Award winners